Venora is a surname. Notable people with the surname include:

Diane Venora (born 1952), American actor
Lee Venora (born 1932), American opera singer and actor